Of Human Bondage is a novel by W. Somerset Maugham published in 1915.

Of Human Bondage may also refer to adaptations of this book:
 Of Human Bondage (1934 film), starring Leslie Howard and Bette Davis
 Of Human Bondage (1946 film), starring Paul Henreid and Eleanor Parker
 Of Human Bondage (1964 film), starring Kim Novak and Laurence Harvey